La Mosca Tsé – Tsé or simply La Mosca (in English: "The Tsetse Fly") is an Argentine rock fusion band, whose music consists of different genres like ska, cumbia, merengue, salsa and pop rock. The group was formed in 1995. Their songs reflect sporadic and eternal love while maintaining some mischief in their lyrics. While the current line-up was consolidated in March 1995, the history of the band goes back to the early 1990s with 'La Reggae & Roll Band', who did covers and some of their own songs in the town of Ramallo.

Among their most widely known songs are successes such as "Yo te quiero dar", "Para no verte más", "Cha Cha Cha", "Todos tenemos un amor", "Te quiero comer la boca", "Baila para mi" and "Muchachos, esta noche me emborracho".

On 11 November 2020, Adrián Cionco died at the age of 48 from heart failure.

For the 2022 World Cup, the band adapted their song "Muchachos, esta noche me emborracho" into an anthem supporting the Argentine team called "Muchachos, ahora nos volvimos a ilusionar," which includes lyrics celebrating Diego Maradona and Lionel Messi. It became an anthem for Argentine fans during the tournament.

Discography 
1998 – Corazones antárticos
1999 – Vísperas de Carnaval
2001 – Buenos Muchachos
2003 – Tango Latino
2004 – Biszzzes
2008 – El regreso (la fiesta continua)
2011 – Moskids: grandes canciones para chicos
2014 - La fiesta continúa

See also 
Latino rock

References

External links 
 

Argentine rock music groups
Musical groups established in 1995
1995 establishments in Argentina
EMI Latin artists